Avon Old Farms School is a single-sex boarding school for boys located in Avon, Connecticut, United States. Theodate Pope Riddle, one of America's first female architects, founded the school in 1927.

History
The school's conception dates to a few years before 1918 when Riddle purchased  of land on which to build it. Together with the architect Charles A. Platt, she toured a number of boys' schools in New England, including Andover, Groton School, Hotchkiss School, Middlesex School, Pomfret School, St. Mark's School, and St. Paul's School, but as she wrote to a friend, "They all illustrate exceedingly well the things I wish to avoid."
In 1918 she created the Pope-Brooks Foundation, to manage both her house, Hill-Stead and its artworks, and the as-yet unformed new school.
The school's earliest buildings, which she designed, were constructed from 1923 to 1926 by over 500 workers from America and the Cotswolds.
For her designs Riddle was elected a Fellow of the American Institute of Architects, and awarded the Robinson Memorial Medal of the Architectural Club of New Haven.

The school opened in the autumn of 1927 with 48 students, who were expected to plant gardens, raise poultry, and work in the dairy and machine shop, smithy, carpenter shop, electrical laboratory, and print shop. It was "organized and governed on the lines of a village political unit, the four upper forms (grades 9-12) being eligible for office as citizens".

The school's earliest days were marked by vigorous disagreements between Riddle and the school's board and members. Its first board was created in September 1926 but immediately dismissed by Riddle when it refused to grant her absolute control over all aspects of the school, including her dictum that "there will be no gymnasium and no indoor inter-school athletics". The school was then run directly by the Pope-Brooks foundation.
Its first Provost (headmaster), John Mitchell Froelicher, served from 1927 to 1929, when he was dismissed. After several abortive attempts to find a replacement, Reverend Percy Gamble Kammerer was named Provost in August 1930. He served until January 1940, when he was forced to resign. That summer, Rev. W. Brooke Stabler was named as his replacement. He, too, had disagreements with Riddle, who was unbending in her authority, and in March 1944, he resigned. At this event, the entire faculty resigned en masse.

Starting in June 1944, during World War II, the campus was reworked to serve as the Old Farms Convalescent Hospital for blind veterans. Riddle died in 1946, the hospital wound down in 1947, and in 1948 the Avon Old Farms School resumed operation under Provost Donald W. Pierpoint.

Athletics
Avon Old Farms is in the Founders League.

Avon ice hockey teams have won nine Division 1 New England Championships (five between 2004 and 2010). In the 2015–16 season, the Winged Beavers won the Founders League and landed third in the USHR standings. On December 21, 2009, Avon played Taft School in the first hockey game played at Fenway Park.

In 2015, the Avon lacrosse team won the Western New England and the Founders League. The 2015 team was also rated as the number one team in New England and one of the best programs in the "Elite 25" by USA Today.

Notable alumni

References

External links

 

Avon, Connecticut
Boys' schools in the United States
Boarding schools in Connecticut
Educational institutions established in 1927
Schools in Hartford County, Connecticut
Private high schools in Connecticut
1927 establishments in Connecticut